The Offences within the Court Act 1541 (33 Hen 8 c 12) was an Act of the Parliament of England.

The whole Act was repealed by section 10(2) of, and Part I of Schedule 3 to, the Criminal Law Act 1967.

References
Halsbury's Statutes,

External links
Text: An Acte for Murther and malicious Bloudshed within the Courte in The Statutes of the Realm, volume III, pages 845–849.

Acts of the Parliament of England (1485–1603)
1541 in law
1541 in England